Evonne Goolagong defeated Helen Gourlay in the final, 6–3, 7–5 to win the women's singles tennis title at the 1971 French Open. It was her first major title.

Margaret Court was the two-time defending champion, but was defeated in the third round by Gail Chanfreau. This marked the first time since the 1964 US Championships that Court failed to reach a major quarterfinal, a run of 19 consecutive majors. It was also her earliest exit from a major since 1962 Wimbledon.

Seeds
The seeded players are listed below. Evonne Goolagong is the champion; others show the round in which they were eliminated.

 Margaret Court (third round)
 Virginia Wade (first round)
 Evonne Goolagong (champion)
 Nancy Gunter (semifinals)
 Helga Masthoff (first round)
 Françoise Dürr (quarterfinals)
 Julie Heldman (third round)
 Olga Morozova (second round)

Qualifying

Draw

Key
 Q = Qualifier
 WC = Wild card
 LL = Lucky loser
 r = Retired

Finals

Earlier rounds

Section 1

Section 2

Section 3

Section 4

References

External links
1971 French Open – Women's draws and results at the International Tennis Federation

Women's Singles
French Open by year – Women's singles
French Open - Women's Singles
1971 in women's tennis
1971 in French women's sport